Kōthamanār (Tamil: கோதமனார்) was a poet of the Sangam period, to whom 2 verses of the Sangam literature have been attributed, including verse 15 of the Tiruvalluva Maalai.

Contribution to the Sangam literature
Kodhamanar has written a sole Sangam verse, namely, verse 366 of the Purananuru, apart from verse 15 of the Tiruvalluva Maalai.

Views on Valluvar and the Kural
Kodhamanar opines about Valluvar and the Kural text thus:

See also

 Sangam literature
 List of Sangam poets
 Tiruvalluva Maalai

Notes

References

 

Tamil philosophy
Tamil poets
Sangam poets
Tiruvalluva Maalai contributors